At least four ships of the French Navy have borne the name Monge:

 , a corvette lost 4 November 1868
 , a  launched in 1908 and sunk in 1915
 , a  launched in 1929 and sunk in 1942
 , a tracking ship launched in 1990

French Navy ship names